Rachaad White (born January 12, 1999) is an American football running back for the Tampa Bay Buccaneers of the National Football League (NFL). He previously played college football at Nebraska–Kearney before transferring to Mt. San Antonio College then to Arizona State and was drafted by the Buccaneers in the third round of the 2022 NFL Draft.

Early life and high school
White grew up in Kansas City, Missouri and attended Center High School. As a senior, he rushed 1,325 yards and totaling over 2,000 all-purpose yards and was named first team Class 3A All-State.

College career
White began his collegiate career at Nebraska–Kearney, where he redshirted as a true freshman. Following the season, he transferred to Mt. San Antonio College. As a sophomore, White rushed for 1,264 yards and 10 touchdowns 

In his first season at Arizona State, White rushed for 420 yards with five touchdowns on 42 carries while also catching eight passes for 151 yards and one touchdown. He was the first Arizona State player to lead the team in both rushing and receiving yards since 1949. As a senior, White rushed for 1,000 yards and 15 touchdowns on 182 carries and caught 43 passes for 456 yards and one touchdown. He had 28 carries for 202 rushing yards and three rushing touchdowns against USC on November 6. One week later, he had 32 carries for 184 rushing yards and two rushing touchdowns against Washington.

College statistics

Professional career

White was drafted by the Tampa Bay Buccaneers in the third round (91st overall) of the 2022 NFL Draft. 

He made his NFL debut in Week 1 against the Dallas Cowboys. He scored his first NFL touchdown on a one-yard rush against the Kansas City Chiefs in Week 4. In Week 10, against the Seattle Seahawks, he had 22 carries for 105 rushing yards in the 21–16 victory. In a Week 13 matchup against the New Orleans Saints, quarterback Tom Brady threw a touchdown pass to White with three seconds remaining to complete a 13-point comeback and for White’s first professional touchdown reception.

References

External links

Tampa Bay Buccaneers
Arizona State Sun Devils bio
Mt. San Antonio Mounties bio
Nebraska–Kearney Lopers Bio

Living people
American football running backs
Arizona State Sun Devils football players
Players of American football from Kansas City, Missouri
Mt. SAC Mounties football players
Nebraska–Kearney Lopers football players
1999 births
Tampa Bay Buccaneers players